Josef "Jupp" Gauchel (11 September 1916 – 21 March 1963) was a German football striker. In the 1930s, he played for TuS Neuendorf (now TuS Koblenz) and was an active member of the squad.

Between 1936 and 1942, he played 16 times for Germany, and scored 13 goals. He went to the 1938 World Cup in France as a player, scoring once. He was also part of Germany's squad at the 1936 Summer Olympics.

References

External links
 

1916 births
1963 deaths
German footballers
Germany international footballers
TuS Koblenz players
1938 FIFA World Cup players
Olympic footballers of Germany
Footballers at the 1936 Summer Olympics
Association football forwards